Glossary of climbing terms relates to rock climbing (including aid climbing, lead climbing, bouldering, and competition climbing), mountaineering, and to ice climbing. 

The terms used can vary between different English-speaking countries; many of the phrases described here are particular to the United States and the United Kingdom.

A

B

{{defn|1=[[File:Craig DeMartino on Zodiac on El Capitan.jpg|thumb|upright=0.7|']]
A long rock climb that takes over a day, and required the hauling of food, water, sleeping bags, or s.}}

 

C

D

 

E

F

G

H

I

J

K

L

M

N

O

P

Q

R

S

T

 

 

U

V

W

X

Y

Z

See also
List of climbing topics – relating to climbing and mountaineering
Climbing equipment – describes equipment used by climbers
Glossary of caving and speleologyMountaineering: The Freedom of the HillsReferences

External links
What’s A Redpoint And What Do Other Climbing Terms Mean? Our Climbing Dictionary Has The Answers, Climbing (May 2022)
UK Climbing (UK) Glossary of Terms from Abseil to Zawn, UK Climbing Magazine'' (May 2006)

Climbing terms
 
Wikipedia glossaries using description lists